The Pratt Memorial Library is a historic public library located in New Milford, Pennsylvania.

History 
The library was opened in 1893 by Mr. Ezra Pratt. It was first located in the front room of a house at 248 Main Street. The house belonged to the principal of the local school, Ulric B. Gillett, and his wife, Addie, was the first librarian. The library contained 1000 volumes donated by Mr. Pratt. It was open once a week and cost 50 cents per year for membership. There was a membership of 200 people by the end of the first year of operation.

Mr. Pratt died in 1898 and his son, Col. Charles Pratt, built the current library building in 1903. The building was made of limestone, had a large copper door, and contained a mechanical clock in the clock tower. In 1922, the Pratt family donated the library to the community and the Pratt Memorial Library Association was formed. In 1952, the clock was replaced with an automatic electric clock which chimed every half-hour.

On July 19, 2003, the library celebrated its 100 year anniversary with an open house. A commemorative booklet was also published, called "The Pratt Memorial Library: Its Origin, Continual Operation and Glorious Centennial Celebration."

Current uses 
The Pratt Memorial Library is still located in the original building. It is free to the public, but is not a member of the Susquehanna County library system. It now has two computers available for public use. It provides books, magazines, and audiobooks. A story hour for children is hosted every summer.

References 
Ahmad, Wasim. "Pa. town honors library's 100 years." Press & Sun Bulletin [Binghamton, NY] July 2003.

Conigliaro, Annette. "Local Library Celebrates 100 Years." Raider Reader [New Milford, PA] July 2003.

New Milford Township and Borough Historical Committee, "A History of New Milford." New Milford, PA: Campbell Printing, 1959.

Van Cott, Nancy. "A History of Pratt Memorial Library." 1987

External links

 Postcard with historical picture
 Picture of library

Public libraries in Pennsylvania
Libraries established in 1893
Buildings and structures in Susquehanna County, Pennsylvania
1893 establishments in Pennsylvania
Library buildings completed in 1903